Peter James Griffiths (born 14 August 1957) is an English former footballer who made 98 league appearances on the right-wing in the English Football League for Stoke City, Bradford City, and Port Vale in the 1980s. He also played non-league football for Bideford, Salisbury United (Australia), Newcastle KB United (Australia), Stafford Rangers, Northwich Victoria, Matlock Town and Milton United. He played in the First Division for Stoke, and helped Port Vale to win promotion out of the Fourth Division in 1985–86.

Career

Stoke City
Griffiths moved from Bideford (Western League) to Alan Durban's Stoke City for a £15,000 fee after a successful trial in November 1980, giving up his job as a self-employed panel beater in the process. He scored his first goal at the Victoria Ground on 27 December 1980, in a 2–2 draw with Coventry City; this was his only goal in five starts and five substitute appearances in the 1980–81 season. Everton made a £150,000 offer for Griffiths, which was rejected by the Stoke board. He scored three goals in 33 games in the 1981–82 season, finding the net against Aston Villa, Middlesbrough and Swansea City early on in the campaign. He soon fell out of the first team picture under Richie Barker, and made just 11 First Division starts in the 1982–83 campaign, finding the net once in a 4–1 win over Birmingham City at St Andrew's on 4 September. He featured just five times for the "Potters" in the 1983–84 season, and was loaned out to Bradford City. He played two Third Division games for Trevor Cherry's "Bantams", in a brief stay at Valley Parade.

Port Vale
Griffiths was signed by Stoke's rivals Port Vale in July 1984. He played regular football in the 1984–85 season, scoring four goals in 39 games, until tearing a groin muscle in April 1985. Upon his recovery he failed to gain his first team spot back at Vale Park, and featured just nine times in the 1985–86 Fourth Division promotion winning campaign. "Valiants" manager John Rudge handed him a free transfer in May 1986.

Later career
He emigrated to Australia to play for Salisbury United, and then National Soccer League side Newcastle KB United, before returning to Staffordshire to play for Conference club Stafford Rangers. After leaving Rangers he played for Northwich Victoria, Matlock Town (Northern Premier League) and Milton United.

Career statistics
Source:

A.  The "Other" column constitutes appearances and goals in the Football League Trophy.

Honours
Port Vale
Football League Fourth Division fourth-place promotion: 1985–86

References

Sportspeople from Barnstaple
English footballers
Association football wingers
Bideford A.F.C. players
Stoke City F.C. players
Port Vale F.C. players
English expatriate footballers
Expatriate soccer players in Australia
Salisbury United FC players
Newcastle KB United players
Bradford City A.F.C. players
Stafford Rangers F.C. players
Northwich Victoria F.C. players
Milton United F.C. (Staffs) players
Matlock Town F.C. players
Western Football League players
English Football League players
National Soccer League (Australia) players
National League (English football) players
Northern Premier League players
1957 births
Living people